Glass Candy is an American electronic music duo from Portland, Oregon, formed in 1996 by vocalist Ida No and producer and multi-instrumentalist Johnny Jewel. The band is part of the Italians Do It Better label. While the band's early work blends elements of no wave, art punk, and glam rock, their later work incorporates synth-pop and Italo disco.

The band has evolved consistently through the years since their original collaboration, and experimenting with various musical styles. They have released a number of albums since the early 2000s, their most recent full-length being the B-side compilation album Deep Gems (2008). In 2010, the band released the six-song EP Feeling Without Touching. The band is working on their upcoming third studio album, Body Work.

History

Beginnings
Glass Candy was formed in Portland, Oregon by Ida No (born Lori Monahan), from Vancouver, Washington, and Johnny Jewel (born John Padgett), from Austin, Texas, in 1996. The two met the year before at a Fred Meyer grocery store where Jewel worked in Portland. They soon began producing music under the name Glass Candy and the Shattered Theatre.

No describes the band's early work as "droney and weird." Their early releases drew heavily from no wave, post-punk, and art rock, as evidenced in their self-released first three singles, "Brittle Women" (1999), "Metal Gods" (2001) and a cover of Josie Cotton's "Johnny Are You Queer" (2002). They toured with The Convocation Of... in 2001, and released a live album that year on the Vermin Scum record label.

Love Love Love and B/E/A/T/B/O/X
Their debut studio album, Love Love Love, was issued on Troubleman Unlimited Records in 2003. In 2006, Jewel founded Italians Do It Better with Mike Simonetti as a subsidiary of Troubleman. In November 2007, Glass Candy released their second studio album B/E/A/T/B/O/X on Italians Do It Better to considerable critical praise. A compilation album titled Deep Gems was released in late 2008, containing rarities, B-sides, and remixes. In a review of Deep Gems, Spin magazine referred to the band as an "[e]ccentric Portland pair" that "spook the dance floor".

Glass Candy's songs were used for a Chloé runway show, as well as used by Karl Lagerfeld for the Spring/Summer '08 Chanel Haute Couture fashion show and the Fall/Winter show of '08/'09.

Glass Candy's song "Digital Versicolor" was featured prominently in Nicolas Winding Refn's 2008 film Bronson, partially in a pair of scenes, and in full over the closing credits. An unofficial music video was made for the song in 2007 and starred Australian actress Rose Byrne.

On February 16, 2010, the band released the six-song EP Feeling Without Touching.

In 2016, Glass Candy's song "Candy Castle" was used in the season one finale of the HBO series Westworld.

2011–present: Body Work
Glass Candy revealed the title of their third studio album, Body Work, in September 2010, with No stating the title is "a tribute to acupuncture, yoga, Rolfing." It was preceded by the single "Warm in the Winter" on September 1, 2011, containing the B-side "Beautiful Object". The song's music video was released on November 6, 2011. "Warm in the Winter" was used in Balenciaga's Fall/Winter 2012/2013 fashion show, as well as in advertising campaigns and short films for companies such as Lucky Brand Jeans and Red Bull. A video for the track "Halloween", another teaser from the album, premiered on October 28, 2011, and is a homage to John Carpenter's 1978 film of the same name. In July 2013, Jewel told Exclaim! that he was still working on Body Work, stating, "I have 17 sets of lyrics and vocals that we recorded that are just incredible."

Glass Candy was invited to perform at a private Chanel party in Berlin on November 20, 2012 to celebrate the release of Karl Lagerfeld's book The Little Black Jacket. Symmetry, Jewel's instrumental project with Nat Walker, opened the evening with an atmospheric 80-minute set leading up to Lagerfeld's arrival.

In 2013, Glass Candy performed at a variety of private fashion/runway events in South America, North America, Europe, and Asia. The band also performed worldwide at a variety of music festivals, including Pitchfork in Paris and Primavera Sound in Spain.

On August 5, 2013, Glass Candy released a music video for the song "Redheads Feel More Pain", which appears on the Italians Do It Better compilation album After Dark 2. The duo released a cover version of Herb Alpert's 1979 instrumental track "Rise" via SoundCloud on December 4, 2014.

Glass Candy's song "Warm in the Winter" has been licensed for usage in many films, TV shows, and advertisements, including the American television series Scream Queens. The track is also used as the theme song for Air France's worldwide company advertising campaign, including their safety video.

Glass Candy digitally released the "Naked City" and "The Beat's Alive" EPs in 2019.

Characteristics
No's vocals have been likened to 1960s German singer Nico and "a frightened Debbie Harry or a pissed-off Lene Lovich in a haunted disco". Their work as of 2008 borrows from Italo disco, freestyle music, Krautrock, hip hop, and new wave.

Jewel has cited Marilyn Monroe films, 1980s cop show soundtracks, Goblin, and John Carpenter soundtracks as inspirational. All music tracks are produced by basic analog equipment, without the use of computers. Critics have also compared the group to Nina Hagen, The Shirelles, David Bowie, James Chance, and Jarboe. Glass Candy has covered songs by James "Sugar Boy" Crawford, Kraftwerk, Roxy Music, Belle Epoque, Dark Day, The Rolling Stones, and Queen. The group has also said that stores could appropriately file their music "between Olivia Newton-John, Suicide and Schoolly D".

Members
Current members
 Ida No – vocals
 Johnny Jewel  – guitar, bass, synthesizers, drums, programming

Former members
 Avalon Kalin – drums
 Jimi Hey – drums
 Dusty Sparkles – saxophone, drums
 Mark Burden – drums
 Ginger Peachs – drums

Discography

Studio albums
 Love Love Love (2003, Troubleman Unlimited)
 B/E/A/T/B/O/X (2007, Italians Do It Better)

Albums sold during tours
 Demos 31, 37 (2001)
 Demos 5.31.2002 (2002)
 The Nite Nurses (2005)
 Music Dream (2006)

Compilation albums
 Deep Gems (2008, Italians Do It Better)

Extended plays
 Smashed Candy (2001, Vermin Scum)
 Iko (2005, Troubleman Unlimited)
 Feeling Without Touching (2010, Italians Do It Better)
 Naked City (2019, Italians Do It Better)
 The Beat's Alive (2019, Italians Do It Better)

Singles
 "Brittle Women" (1999, self-released; re-released as "Bräckliga Kvinnor" in 2003 by Troubleman Unlimited)
 "Metal Gods" (2001, self-released)
 "Love on a Plate" (2002, Troubleman Unlimited)
 "Excite Bike" (2003, Troubleman Unlimited)
 "Life After Sundown" (2004, Troubleman Unlimited)
 "I Always Say Yes" (2007, Troubleman Unlimited)
 "Miss Broadway" (2007, Italians Do It Better)
 "Digital Versicolor" (2007, Italians Do It Better)
 "Geto Boys" (2009, Italians Do It Better)
 "Warm in the Winter" (2011, Italians Do It Better)
 "The Possessed" (2013, Italians Do It Better)
 "Rise" (2014, Italians Do It Better)

Miscellaneous
 I Always Say Yes (2006, Italians Do It Better)

References

External links
 
 Glass Candy at Free Music Archive 
 The Art Pack – Glass Candy Unplugged on Dailymotion

1996 establishments in Oregon
American electronic rock musical groups
American musical duos
American synth-pop groups
Dance-punk musical groups
Electronic music duos
Electronic music groups from Oregon
Italo disco groups
Male–female musical duos
Musical groups established in 1996
Musical groups from Portland, Oregon